This is a list of articles about poetry in a single language or produced by a single nation.

World languages will tend to have a large body of poetry contributed to by several nations (Anglosphere, Francophonie, Latin America, German-speaking Europe), while for smaller languages, the body of poetry in a particular language will be identical to the national poetry of the nation or ethnicity associated with that language.

Contemporary

Asia

Middle East
 Persian poets
 Piyyut
 Modern Hebrew poetry

Near East
 Arabic poetry
 Azerbaijani literature
 Persian poetry
Turkish poetry

South Asia
 Afghan poetry
 Pashto literature and poetry
 Bangladeshi poetry
 Puthi
 Indian poetry
 Assamese Poetry
 Bengali poetry
 Gujarati poetry
 Hindi poetry
 Kannada poetry
 Kashmiri poetry
 Malayalam poetry
 Marathi poetry
 Meitei poetry (Manipuri poetry) 
 Nepali poetry
 Rajasthani poetry
 Sindhi poetry
 Tamil poetry
 Telugu poetry
 Urdu poetry
 Indian Poetry in English
 Pakistani poetry
 Urdu poetry

East Asia
 Chinese poetry
 Japanese poetry
 Korean poetry
 Vietnamese poetry

Southeast Asia
 Javanese poetry
 Thai poetry
 Filipino poetry
 Singaporean Poetry
 Southeast asian poetry

Europe
 Albanian poetry
 British poetry
 Cornish poetry
 English poetry
 Old English poetry
 Manx poetry
 Scottish poetry
 Welsh poetry
 Anglo-Welsh poetry
 Catalan poetry
 Finnish poetry
 French poetry
 German poetry
 Icelandic poetry
 Irish poetry
 Italian poetry
 List of Polish language poets
 Portuguese poetry
 Romanian poetry
 Russian poetry
 Bulgarian poetry
 Serbian epic poetry
 Slovak poetry
 Spanish poetry
 Ukrainian poetry

Americas
 Brazilian poetry
 Canadian poetry
 Latin American poetry
 Mexican poetry
 Peruvian poetry
 United States poetry
 Puerto Rican poetry

Africa
Malagasy poetry
South African poetry
Swahili poetry

Historical

Rhapsode
Rishi
Sanskrit poetry
Indian epic poetry
Bard
Skald
Germanic poetry
Old Norse poetry
Biblical poetry
Hebrew and Jewish epic poetry
 Ghazal
 Latin poetry

See also 

Ethnopoetics
Latin American poetry